
Gmina Bytoń is a rural gmina (administrative district) in Radziejów County, Kuyavian-Pomeranian Voivodeship, in north-central Poland.

Villages
Gmina Bytoń contains the villages and settlements of Borowo, Budzisław, Bytoń, Czarnocice, Dąbrówka, Litychowo, Ludwikowo, Morzyce, Nasiłowo, Niegibalice, Nowy Dwór, Pścinek, Pścinno, Stefanowo, Stróżewo, Świesz, Wandynowo and Witowo.

Neighbouring gminas
Gmina Bytoń is bordered by the gminas of Osięciny, Piotrków Kujawski, Radziejów and Topólka.

References
Polish official population figures 2006

Byton
Radziejów County